HNLMS Van Kinsbergen (F809) was a frigate of the . The ship was in service with the Royal Netherlands Navy from 1980 to 1995. The frigate was named after Dutch naval hero Jan Hendrik van Kinsbergen.

Design and construction
In the early 1970s the Royal Netherlands Navy developed a 'Standard' frigate design to replace the destroyers of the - and es. The 'Standard' design would have anti-submarine (the ) and anti-aircraft (the ) variants with different armaments on a common hull design. The first eight Kortenaers were ordered in 1974, with four more ordered in 1976, although two were sold to Greece while being built, and replaced by two of the anti-aircraft variant.

Displacement was  standard and  full load. The ship was powered by two  Rolls-Royce Olympus TM 3B and two  Rolls-Royce Tyne TM 1C gas turbines in a combined gas or gas (COGOG) arrangement, driving two propeller shafts.

Van Kinsbergens main anti-aircraft armament was an 8-round NATO Sea Sparrow surface-to-air missile launcher in front of the bridge. An OTO Melara 76 mm was fitted forward of the Sea Sparrow launcher, while a Goalkeeper CIWS was planned to be fitted aft, on the roof of the ship's hangar. Goalkeeper was not available when the ships were built, however, and Van Kinsbergen was completed with a Bofors 40 mm L/60 anti-aircraft gun in its place. Eight Harpoon anti-ship missiles could be carried in two quadruple launchers, although two or four Harpoons was a more normal peacetime load-out. A hangar and fight deck were fitted to accommodate two Westland Lynx helicopters, although only one was normally carried. Close-in anti submarine armament was provided by four 324 mm tubes for US Mark 46 torpedoes. A Signaal LW-08 long-range air search radar was fitted, together with a ZW-06 surface-search radar, with WM-25 and STIR-180 fire control radars to direct the ship's armament. A Canadian SQS-505 hull-mounted sonar was fitted.

Van Kinsbergens Bofors was replaced by the intended Goalkeeper by 1995. On transfer to Greece, the Goalkeeper was removed. Greece replaced it by an American Phalanx CIWS, while Agusta-Bell AB 212 helicopters replaced the Lynxes.

HNLMS Van Kinsbergen was laid down at the Koninklijke Maatschappij De Schelde (KM de Schelde) shipyard in Vlissingen on 2 September 1975. She was launched on 16 April 1977 and commissioned into service on 24 April 1980 with the Pennant number F 809. The ship's radio call sign was "PADC".

Dutch service history
The ships returned on 19 June.

In 1995 the vessel was transferred to the Hellenic Navy.

Greek service history

The ship was commissioned into the Hellenic Navy on 1 March 1995, with the new name Navarinon and the pennant number F 461.

On 28 December the ship participated in a rescue mission to assist  after it caught fire.

Notes

References
 
 
 
 
 
 

Kortenaer-class frigates
1977 ships
Ships built in Vlissingen